Dormitator cubanus is a species of fish in the family Eleotridae found in Cuba.

References

 Kullander, S.O., 2003. Gobiidae (Gobies). p. 657-665. In R.E. Reis, S.O. Kullander and C.J. Ferraris, Jr. (eds.) Checklist of the freshwater fishes of South and Central America. Porto Alegre: EDIPUCRS, Brasil. 

cubanus
Taxa named by Isaac Ginsburg
Fish described in 1953